Aane Wala Pal is a Hindi-language Indian soap opera that aired on DD Metro channel.

Plot 
The serial is based on a story of passion, relationships, and friendship. It is a story of human beings whose hopes and aspirations are caught in a roller coaster of emotions, who wish to live and let live but are afraid what the coming times will have in store. This story examines coping in bitter relationships.

Cast 
 Alok Nath as Mamaji
 Asha Sharma
 Raza Murad
 Shweta Tiwari as Anu
 Rajeev Verma
 Gajendra Chauhan
 Amita Nangia
 Nakul Vaid
 Firdaus Dadi
 Mahru Sheikh
 Nitin Rai
 Shilpa Kataria
 Iqlaq Khan
 Dharmesh Tiwari
 Anil Parmar
 Nisha Rawal
 Sneha Rao
 Rakhi Malhotra
 Anuj Gupta
 Dilip Pawle
 Itishree Singh
 Gyan Prakash
 Manish Khanna
 Shweta Gautam
 Shanu Sabbagh

External links
Official Website

Indian drama television series
DD Metro original programming
2001 Indian television series debuts